Jamie Moses is a Canadian politician. Since 2019, he has represented the St. Vital electoral district in the Legislative Assembly of Manitoba. Moses is a member of the Manitoba New Democratic Party (Manitoba NDP).

Biography 
Moses was born in Winnipeg and is a graduate of River East Collegiate. He holds a Bachelor in Agribusiness from the University of Manitoba.  Moses is an athlete and is a former Manitoba AAAA provincial male athlete of the year. He currently holds the Winnipeg High School Football League record for the most receiving yards in a game. He also played football for the University of Manitoba Bisons.  Prior to his political career he worked at the Investors Group, technology company Rapid RTC and the Canadian Wheat Board.

Legislative Assembly of Manitoba 
In the 2019 Manitoba general election, Moses was elected to represent the St. Vital electoral district.  Moses, alongside Uzoma Asagwara and Audrey Gordon, is one of the first three Black Canadian MLAs elected in Manitoba. He currently serves as the Official Opposition Critic for Economic Development and Training.

Moses was elected in 2019 after he defeated Progressive Conservative MLA and cabinet minister Colleen Mayer. Previously, he ran for the NDP and came second to Mayer in St. Vital in the 2016 election after former minister Nancy Allan chose not to seek re-election.

In October 2021, Moses introduced private members Bill 232, to recognize August 1 of every year as Emancipation Day in Manitoba, commemorating the day the Slavery Abolition Act took effect in the British Empire in 1834. The legislature passed the bill unanimously as the Emancipation Day Act.

Electoral results

References

New Democratic Party of Manitoba MLAs
Black Canadian politicians
Living people
21st-century Canadian politicians
Politicians from Winnipeg
Year of birth missing (living people)